Victor Niculescu (born 21 April 1949) is a Romanian former footballer who played as a central defender. He was part of "U" Craiova's team that won the 1973–74 Divizia A, which was the first trophy in the club's history. He won the Universiade gold medal with Romania's students football team in the 1974 edition that was held in France, playing alongside László Bölöni, Gheorghe Mulțescu, Dan Păltinișanu, Romulus Chihaia and Paul Cazan.

Honours
Universitatea Craiova
Divizia A: 1973–74
Cupa României runner-up: 1974–75

References

External links
Victor Niculescu at Labtof.ro

1949 births
Living people
Romanian footballers
Association football defenders
Liga I players
CS Universitatea Craiova players
CSM Jiul Petroșani players
CS Corvinul Hunedoara players
Sportspeople from Craiova